Federal elections were held in Switzerland on 18 October 1987. The Free Democratic Party remained the largest party in the National Council, winning 51 of the 200 seats.

Results

National Council

By constituency

Council of the States

References

Switzerland
Federal elections in Switzerland
October 1987 events in Europe
1987 in Switzerland